Lower Withington is a civil parish and village in Cheshire, England. At the 2001 census, it had a population of 492. Jodrell Bank Observatory lies mostly within the parish.

See also

Listed buildings in Lower Withington

References

External links

 Lower Withington Parish Council

Civil parishes in Cheshire
Villages in Cheshire